The Spread the Love Tour was the fifteenth headlining concert tour by American country music artist Kenny Chesney, in support of his seventeenth studio album Cosmic Hallelujah (2016). It began on April 23, 2016 in Auburn, Alabama and finished on September 9, 2016 in Bristol, Tennessee. The tour was first announced in October 2015.

Opening acts

 
The Band Perry
Big & Rich
Sam Hunt
Miranda Lambert
Little Big Town
Old Dominion
Jake Owen

Setlists
Some songs not performed at every show, and not always in the same order. 

"Beer in Mexico"
"Reality"
"Til It's Gone"
"Summertime"
"Pirate Flag"
"No Shoes, No Shirt, No Problems"
"Somewhere with You"
"I Go Back"
"Anything but Mine"
"American Kids"
"Out Last Night"
"Living in Fast Forward"
"Young"
"Come Over" 
"You and Tequila" 
"The Fireman" 
"Whole Lotta Rosie" 
"Save It for a Rainy Day" 
"Noise"
"Living in Fast Forward"
"My Home's in Alabama"
"How Forever Feels"
"The Joker"/"Three Little Birds"
"Old Blue Chair"
"Ocean Front Property" 
"Big Star"
"She Thinks My Tractor's Sexy"
"How Forever Feels"
"Don't Happen Twice"
"Save It for a Rainy Day"
"Diggin' Up Bones"

Tour dates

List of festivals

Band
Kenny Chesney – Lead vocals, guitar
Wyatt Beard – Keyboards
Harmoni Kelley – Bass

References

2016 concert tours
Kenny Chesney concert tours